is a Japanese curler from Karuizawa, Nagano. She is the second on the SC Karuizawa Club curling team, which is skipped by Asuka Kanai. At the international level, she represented Japan at the 2005 Pacific Curling Championships and the 2006 World Women's Curling Championship as a result of winning the 2005 Japan Curling Championships.

Career
Nishimuro won her first Japan Curling Championships title in 2005 with teammates Yukako Tsuchiya, Tomoko Sonobe, Chiemi Kameyama and Mitsuki Sato. She had previously won silver in 2003 and bronze in 1998. This qualified the team to represent Japan at the 2005 Pacific Curling Championships in Taipei, Chinese Taipei. Through the round robin, the team placed second with a 4–1 record. They then beat New Zealand in the semifinal and China's Wang Bingyu in the final to win the gold medal. With the win, they qualified for the 2006 World Women's Curling Championship in Grande Prairie, Alberta. At the Worlds, the team struggled, finishing eleventh out of twelve teams with a 3–8 record.

In 2007, the Tsuchiya rink represented Japan at the 2007 Asian Winter Games. After the double round robin, they finished first with a 5–1 record. This earned them a bye to the championship final where they were defeated by South Korea, earning the silver medal.

Nishimuro would not win another national title until 2018, where as the alternate for the Tori Koana team, they defeated the Ayumi Ogasawara rink in the championship final. Nishimuro previously threw fourth stones on the Fujikyu team from 2015 to 2017, earning two bronze medals and one silver at the Japanese championship. Despite winning the Japanese championship, Nishimuro did not participate in the 2018 World Women's Curling Championship with the team and was instead replaced by Kaho Onodera of Team Ogasawara.

During the 2018–19 season, Team Koana were named as the Japanese representatives at the third leg of the 2018–19 Curling World Cup. At the event, they finished with a 2–4 record.

Personal life
Nishimuro was previously employed at Fujikyu during her time with Team Koana. She was previously a speed skater before switching to curling in junior high school.

Teams

References

External links

Living people
1980 births
Sportspeople from Nagano Prefecture
Japanese female curlers
Asian Games medalists in curling
Curlers at the 2007 Asian Winter Games
Medalists at the 2007 Asian Winter Games
Asian Games silver medalists for Japan
Pacific-Asian curling champions
20th-century Japanese women
21st-century Japanese women